The 2023 WGC-Dell Technologies Match Play will be the 24th and final WGC Match Play, played March 22–26 at Austin Country Club in Austin, Texas.

The field consisted of the top 64 available eligible players from the Official World Golf Ranking on March 13. A number of other players were in the top 64 but, having joined LIV Golf, were suspended by the PGA Tour and ineligible to compete.

On March 6, 2023, tournament organizers and the PGA Tour announced that the 2023 event would be the last edition of WGC Match Play.

Format
The 64 players were placed into four seeded pools, the 16 highest ranked players as of March 20 in Pool A, the next 16 in Pool B, etc. The top seeds (Pool A) are placed into 16 groups in order, with the groups completed by means of a random draw of one player from each of the remaining pools.
Each group is played as a round-robin of match play matches, held on Wednesday, Thursday and Friday, with one point awarded for a win and half a point for a tie. The 16 group winners advance to the knockout stage. If two or more players are tied on points at the end of the group stage, there is a sudden death stroke play playoff between the tied players to determine the winner of the group.
In the knockout stage, the round of 16 is played on Saturday morning, with the quarterfinals on Saturday afternoon. The semi-finals are played on Sunday morning, and the final and third place playoff are played on Sunday afternoon. In total, barring withdrawals, those reaching the last four play seven rounds of golf.

Field
The field consisted of the top 64 available eligible players from the Official World Golf Ranking on March 13. They are listed with their ranking as of March 20, which determined the seeding, followed in parentheses by their ranking as of March 13.

Justin Thomas (10) and Justin Rose (32) were eligible but did not play.

Ineligible players
The following players were ineligible to compete, having been suspended by the PGA Tour after joining LIV Golf. Their world rankings as of March 13 are given.

Cameron Smith (5)
Joaquín Niemann (26)
Abraham Ancer (30)
Thomas Pieters (42)
Talor Gooch (49)
Mito Pereira (50)
Harold Varner III (51)
Dustin Johnson (62)
Patrick Reed (65)
Dean Burmester (71)
Jason Kokrak (74)

Results

Pool play
Players are divided into 16 groups of four players, and play round-robin matches Wednesday to Friday.
Round 1 – March 22
Round 2 – March 23
Round 3 – March 24

Group 1

Group 2

Group 3

Group 4

Group 5

Group 6

Group 7

Group 8

Group 9

Group 10

Group 11

Group 12

Group 13

Group 14

Group 15

Group 16

Final 16 bracket

Notes

References

External links

Coverage on the European Tour's official site

WGC Match Play
Golf in Texas
Sports in Austin, Texas
WGC-Dell Technologies Match Play Championship
WGC-Dell Technologies Match Play Championship
WGC-Dell Technologies Match Play Championship
WGC-Dell Technologies Match Play Championship